Penicillium turbatum is an anamorph species of fungus in the genus Penicillium which was isolated from Taxus baccata. Penicillium turbatum produces pipolythiopiperazinedione-antibiotics, hyalodendrin A and hadacitin.

References

Further reading 
 
 
 
 

turbatum
Fungi described in 1911